The 2020–21 Atlanta Hawks season was the 72nd season of the franchise in the National Basketball Association (NBA) and the 53rd in Atlanta. On March 1, 2021, head coach Lloyd Pierce was fired after a 14–20 start and replaced by Nate McMillan, who would serve out the remainder of the year as interim head coach. On May 12, the Hawks clinched their first playoff appearance since 2017, ending their four-year playoff drought. On May 15, The Hawks clinched their first Southeast Division title since 2014–15 when the Miami Heat lost to the Milwaukee Bucks 122–108.

The Hawks surprised many on their playoff run as they went on to defeat the fourth seeded New York Knicks in five games in the first round. Then in a major upset, the Hawks defeated the top seeded Philadelphia 76ers in seven games in the Eastern Conference Semi-finals; two of their victories involved coming back from large deficits. They advanced to the Eastern Conference Finals for the first time since 2015. However, their run would come to an end as they lost in six games to the eventual champion Milwaukee Bucks in the Eastern Conference Finals, coached by former Hawks coach Mike Budenholzer, who had led them to the Eastern Conference Finals in 2015. The team is similar to the 1977–78 Seattle SuperSonics, as both teams struggled early on, made a coaching change, got a better record to surge up the standings, and had an unexpectedly deep playoff run.

Draft picks

Roster

Standings

Division

Conference

Notes
 z – Clinched home court advantage for the entire playoffs
 c – Clinched home court advantage for the conference playoffs
 y – Clinched division title
 x – Clinched playoff spot
 pb – Clinched play-in spot
 o – Eliminated from playoff contention
 * – Division leader

Game log

Preseason 

|-style="background:#fcc;"
| 1
| December 11
| Orlando
| 
| De'Andre Hunter (18)
| Clint Capela (14)
| Trae Young (6)
| State Farm Arena
| 0–1
|-style="background:#cfc;"
| 2
| December 13
| Orlando
| 
| Trae Young (21)
| Clint Capela (12)
| Trae Young (7)
| State Farm Arena
| 1–1
|-style="background:#fcc;"
| 3
| December 17
| @ Memphis
| 
| De'Andre Hunter (22)
| Clint Capela (9)
| Rajon Rondo (7)
| FedExForum
| 1–2
|-style="background:#cfc;"
| 4
| December 19
| @ Memphis
| 
| Danilo Gallinari (19)
| Clint Capela (7)
| Bogdan Bogdanović (7)
| FedExForum
| 2–2

Regular season

|-style="background:#cfc;"
| 1
| December 23
| @ Chicago
| 
| Trae Young (37)
| Bogdanović, Fernando (7)
| Trae Young (7)
| United Center0
| 1–0
|-style="background:#cfc;"
| 2
| December 26
| @ Memphis
| 
| Trae Young (36)
| De'Andre Hunter (11)
| Trae Young (9)
| FedExForum0
| 2–0
|-style="background:#cfc;"
| 3
| December 28
| Detroit
| 
| Trae Young (29)
| Clint Capela (9)
| Rajon Rondo (8)
| State Farm Arena0
| 3–0
|-style="background:#fcc;"
| 4
| December 30
| @ Brooklyn
| 
| Young, Collins (30)
| Clint Capela (12)
| Trae Young (11)
| Barclays Center0
| 3–1

|-style="background:#cfc;"
| 5
| January 1
| @ Brooklyn
| 
| De'Andre Hunter (23)
| Clint Capela (11)
| Trae Young (7)
| Barclays Center0
| 4–1
|-style="background:#fcc;"
| 6
| January 2
| Cleveland
| 
| De'Andre Hunter (17)
| Clint Capela (16)
| Trae Young (10)
| State Farm Arena0
| 4–2
|-style="background:#fcc;"
| 7
| January 4
| New York
| 
| Trae Young (31)
| Clint Capela (12)
| Trae Young (14)
| State Farm Arena0
| 4–3
|-style="background:#fcc;"
| 8
| January 6
| Charlotte
| 
| John Collins (23)
| Clint Capela (19)
| Kevin Huerter (6)
| State Farm Arena0
| 4–4
|-style="background:#fcc;"
| 9
| January 9
| @ Charlotte
| 
| Cam Reddish (21)
| Clint Capela (13)
| Trae Young (10)
| Spectrum Center0
| 4–5
|-style="background:#cfc;"
| 10
| January 11
| Philadelphia
| 
| Trae Young (26)
| Clint Capela (11)
| Trae Young (8)
| State Farm Arena0
| 5–5
|-style="background:#ccc;"
| —
| January 13
| @ Phoenix
| colspan="6" | Postponed (COVID-19) (Makeup date: March 30)
|-style="background:#fcc;"
| 11
| January 15
| @ Utah
| 
| Cam Reddish (20)
| Clint Capela (11)
| Trae Young (7)
| Vivint Smart Home Arena1,932
| 5–6
|-style="background:#fcc;
| 12
| January 16
| @ Portland
| 
| Clint Capela (25)
| Clint Capela (15)
| Trae Young (11)
| Moda Center0
| 5–7
|-style="background:#cfc;"
| 13
| January 18
| Minnesota
| 
| De'Andre Hunter (25)
| Clint Capela (15)
| Trae Young (13)
| State Farm Arena0
| 6–7
|-style="background:#cfc;"
| 14
| January 20
| Detroit
| 
| Trae Young (38)
| Clint Capela (26)
| Trae Young (10)
| State Farm Arena0
| 7–7
|-style="background:#cfc;"
| 15
| January 22
| @ Minnesota
| 
| Trae Young (43)
| Clint Capela (19)
| Rajon Rondo (6)
| Target Center0
| 8–7
|-style="background:#fcc;"
| 16
| January 24
| @ Milwaukee
| 
| De'Andre Hunter (33)
| John Collins (7)
| Rajon Rondo (7)
| Fiserv Forum0
| 8–8
|-style="background:#cfc;"
| 17
| January 26
| L. A. Clippers
| 
| Trae Young (38)
| Clint Capela (18)
| Trae Young (5)
| State Farm Arena1,180
| 9–8
|-style="background:#fcc;"
| 18
| January 27
| Brooklyn
| 
| Trae Young (28)
| Clint Capela (11)
| Trae Young (14)
| State Farm Arena1,008
| 9–9
|-style="background:#cfc;"
| 19
| January 29
| @ Washington
| 
| Trae Young (41)
| Clint Capela (14)
| Trae Young (5)
| Capital One Arena0
| 10–9

|-style="background:#fcc;"
| 20
| February 1
| L. A. Lakers
| 
| Trae Young (25)
| Clint Capela (13)
| Trae Young (16)
| State Farm Arena1,341
| 10–10
|-style="background:#fcc;"
| 21
| February 3
| Dallas
| 
| John Collins (35)
| Clint Capela (13)
| Kevin Huerter (10)
| State Farm Arena1,259
| 10–11
|-style="background:#fcc;"
| 22
| February 4
| Utah
| 
| Kevin Huerter (16)
| Clint Capela (17)
| Rajon Rondo (8)
| State Farm Arena1,261
| 10–12
|-style="background:#cfc;"
| 23
| February 6
| Toronto
| 
| Trae Young (28)
| Clint Capela (16)
| Trae Young (13)
| State Farm Arena991
| 11–12
|-style="background:#fcc;"
| 24
| February 10
| Dallas
| 
| John Collins (33)
| Collins, Huerter (8)
| Trae Young (15)
| American Airlines Center1,000
| 11–13
|-style="background:#fcc;"
| 25
| February 12
| San Antonio
| 
| Trae Young (25)
| Clint Capela (11)
| Kevin Huerter (4)
| State Farm Arena1,451
| 11–14
|-style="background:#fcc;"
| 26
| February 13
| Indiana
| 
| Clint Capela (24)
| Clint Capela (10)
| Trae Young (14)
| State Farm Arena1,393
| 11–15
|-style="background:#fcc;"
| 27
| February 15
| @ New York
| 
| Trae Young (23)
| Clint Capela (18)
| Trae Young (8)
| Madison Square Garden0
| 11–16
|-style="background:#cfc;"
| 28
| February 17
| @ Boston
| 
| Trae Young (40)
| Clint Capela (13)
| Trae Young (8)
| TD Garden0
| 12–16
|-style="background:#fcc;"
| 29
| February 19
| @ Boston
| 
| Trae Young (31)
| Clint Capela (15)
| Trae Young (11)
| TD Garden0
| 12–17
|-style="background:#cfc;"
| 30
|February 21
| Denver
| 
| Trae Young (35)
| John Collins (11)
| Trae Young (15)
| State Farm Arena1,362
| 13–17
|-style="background:#fcc;"
| 31
| February 23
| @ Cleveland
| 
| Trae Young (28)
| Clint Capela (16)
| Trae Young (12)
| Rocket Mortgage FieldHouse 2,720
| 13–18 
|-style="background:#cfc;"
| 32
| February 24
| Boston
| 
| Danilo Gallinari (38)
| John Collins (11)
| Trae Young (7)
| State Farm Arena1,537
| 14–18
|-style="background:#fcc;"
| 33
| February 26
| @ Oklahoma City
| 
| John Collins (25)
| Clint Capela (21)
| Trae Young (8)
| Chesapeake Energy Arena0
| 14–19
|-style="background:#fcc;"
| 34 
| February 28
| @ Miami
|
| John Collins (34)
| Clint Capela (14)
| Trae Young (9)
| American Airlines ArenaLimited seating
| 14–20

|-style="background:#cfc;"
| 35
| March 2
|  @ Miami
| 
| Trae Young (18)
| Clint Capela (17)
| Trae Young (10)
| American Airlines ArenaLimited seating
| 15–20
|-style="background:#cfc;"
| 36
| March 3
|  @ Orlando
| 
| Trae Young (32)
| Collins, Gallinari (9)
| Trae Young (8)
| Amway Center3,969
| 16–20
|-style="background:#cfc;"
| 37
| March 11
|  @ Toronto
| 
| Trae Young (37)
| Clint Capela (18)
| Trae Young (7)
| Amalie Arena0
| 17–20
|-style="background:#cfc;"
| 38
| March 13
| Sacramento
| 
| Trae Young (28)
| Clint Capela (14)
| Trae Young (9)
| State Farm Arena 2,347
| 18–20
|-style="background:#cfc;"
| 39
| March 14
| Cleveland
| 
| John Collins (22)
| John Collins (13)
| Trae Young (6)
| State Farm Arena2,322
| 19–20
|-style="background:#cfc;"
| 40
| March 16
| @ Houston
| 
| Danilo Gallinari (29)
| John Collins (10)
| Trae Young (14)
| Toyota Center3,069
| 20–20
|-style="background:#cfc;"
| 41
| March 18
| Oklahoma City
| 
| Young, Bogdanović (23)
| Danilo Gallinari (9)
| Trae Young (9)
| State Farm Arena2,621
| 21–20
|-style="background:#cfc;"
| 42
| March 20
| @ L. A. Lakers
| 
| John Collins (27)
| Capela, Collins (16)
| Trae Young (9)
| Staples Center0
| 22–20
|-style="background:#fcc;"
| 43
| March 22
| @ L. A. Clippers
| 
| Trae Young (28)
| Clint Capela (14)
| Trae Young (8)
| Staples Center0
| 22–21
|-style="background:#fcc;"
| 44
| March 24
| @ Sacramento
| 
| Trae Young (29)
| Clint Capela (17)
| Trae Young (9)
| Golden 1 Center0
| 22–22
|-style="background:#cfc;"
| 45
| March 26
| @ Golden State
| 
| Collins (38)
| Clint Capela (15)
| Trae Young (15)
| Chase Center0
| 23–22
|-style="background:#fcc;"
| 46
| March 28
| @ Denver
| 
| Trae Young (21)
| Clint Capela (8)
| Trae Young (7)
| Ball Arena0
| 23–23
|-style="background:#fcc;"
| 47
| March 30
| @ Phoenix
| 
| Bogdan Bogdanović (22)
| Clint Capela (16)
| Trae Young (13)
| Phoenix Suns Arena3,173
| 23–24

|-style="background:#cfc;"
| 48
| April 1
| @ San Antonio
| 
| Trae Young (30)
| Clint Capela (17)
| Trae Young (12)
| AT&T Center2,949
| 24–24
|-style="background:#cfc;"
| 49
| April 2
| @ New Orleans
| 
| Bogdan Bogdanović (26)
| Clint Capela (10)
| Bogdan Bogdanović (7)
| Smoothie King Center3,700
| 25–24
|-style="background:#cfc;"
| 50
| April 4
| Golden State
| 
| Clint Capela (24)
| Clint Capela (18)
| Bogdan Bogdanović (5)
| State Farm Arena2,937
| 26–24
|-style="background:#cfc;"
| 51
| April 6
| New Orleans
| 
| Trae Young (30)
| Clint Capela (12)
| Trae Young (12)
| State Farm Arena2,816
| 27–24
|-style="background:#fcc;"
| 52
| April 7
| Memphis
| 
| Bogdan Bogdanović (24)
| Onyeka Okongwu (11)
| Trae Young (11)
| State Farm Arena2,774
| 27–25
|-style="background:#cfc;"
| 53
| April 9
| Chicago
| 
| Trae Young (42)
| Clint Capela (10)
| Trae Young (9)
| State Farm Arena996
| 28–25
|-style="background:#cfc;"
| 54
| April 11
| @ Charlotte
| 
| Bogdan Bogdanović (32)
| Clint Capela (15)
| Brandon Goodwin (8)
| Spectrum Center4,148
| 29–25
|-style="background:#cfc;"
| 55
| April 13
| @ Toronto
| 
| Brandon Goodwin (23)
| Clint Capela (21)
| Lou Williams (5)
| Amalie Arena1,427
| 30–25
|-style="background:#fcc;"
| 56
| April 15
| Milwaukee
| 
| Bogdan Bogdanović (28)
| Clint Capela (16)
| Trae Young (9)
| State Farm ArenaLimited seating
| 30–26
|-style="background:#cfc;"
| 57
| April 18
| Indiana
| 
| Trae Young (34)
| Clint Capela (24)
| Trae Young (11)
| State Farm ArenaLimited seating
| 31–26
|-style="background:#cfc;"
| 58
| April 20
| Orlando
| 
| Trae Young (25)
| Clint Capela (19)
| Trae Young (7)
| State Farm Arena2,219
| 32–26
|-style="background:#fcc;"
| 59
| April 21
| @ New York
| 
| Clint Capela (25)
| Clint Capela (22)
| Trae Young (14)
| Madison Square Garden1,981
| 32–27
|-style="background:#cfc;"
| 60
| April 23
| Miami
| 
| Bogdan Bogdanović (21)
| John Collins (8)
| Bogdan Bogdanović (8)
| State Farm Arena2,985
| 33–27
|-style="background:#cfc;"
| 61
| April 25
| Milwaukee
| 
| Bogdan Bogdanović (32)
| Clint Capela (14)
| Lou Williams (6)
| State Farm Arena3,010
| 34–27
|-style="background:#fcc;"
| 62
| April 26
| @ Detroit
| 
| Bogdan Bogdanović (17)
| Clint Capela (15)
| Brandon Goodwin (7)
| Little Caesars Arena750
| 34–28
|-style="background:#fcc;"
| 63
| April 28
| @ Philadelphia
| 
| John Collins (21)
| Capela, Williams (8)
| Lou Williams (5)
| Wells Fargo Center4,094
| 34–29
|-style="background:#fcc;"
| 64
| April 30
| @ Philadelphia
| 
| Trae Young (32)
| Clint Capela (15)
| Trae Young (4)
| Wells Fargo Center4,094
| 34–30

|-style="background:#cfc;"
| 65
| May 1
| Chicago
| 
| Trae Young (33)
| Clint Capela (11)
| Trae Young (7)
| State Farm Arena3,053
| 35–30
|-style="background:#cfc;"
| 66
| May 3
| Portland
| 
| Danilo Gallinari (28)
| Clint Capela (10)
| Trae Young (11)
| State Farm Arena3,091
| 36–30
|-style="background:#cfc;"
| 67
| May 5
| Phoenix
| 
| Clint Capela (18)
| Clint Capela (10)
| Trae Young (12)
| State Farm Arena3,205
| 37–30
|-style="background:#fcc;"
| 68
| May 6
| @ Indiana
| 
| Trae Young (30)
| Clint Capela (9)
| Trae Young (10)
| Bankers Life Fieldhouse0
| 37–31
|-style="background:#cfc;"
| 69
| May 10
| Washington
| 
| Trae Young (36)
| Clint Capela (22)
| Trae Young (9)
| State Farm Arena3,054
| 38–31
|-style="background:#cfc;"
| 70
| May 12
| Washington
| 
| Trae Young (33)
| Clint Capela (11)
| Trae Young (9)
| State Farm Arena3,120
| 39–31
|-style="background:#cfc;"
| 71
| May 13
| Orlando
| 
| Bogdan Bogdanović (27)
| Clint Capela (14)
| Trae Young (7)
| State Farm Arena2,910
| 40–31
|-style="background:#cfc;"
| 72
| May 16
| Houston
| 
| Onyeka Okongwu (21)
| Onyeka Okongwu (15)
| Trae Young (9)
| State Farm Arena3,045
| 41–31

Playoffs 

|-style="background:#cfc;"
| 1
| May 23
| @ New York
| 
| Trae Young (32)
| Clint Capela (13)
| Trae Young (10)
| Madison Square Garden15,047
| 1–0
|-style="background:#fcc;"
| 2
| May 26
| @ New York
| 
| Trae Young (30)
| Clint Capela (12)
| Trae Young (7)
| Madison Square Garden16,254
| 1–1
|-style="background:#cfc;"
| 3
| May 28
| New York
| 
| Trae Young (21)
| Clint Capela (12)
| Trae Young (14)
| State Farm Arena15,743
| 2–1
|-style="background:#cfc;"
| 4
| May 30
| New York
| 
| Trae Young (27)
| Clint Capela (15)
| Trae Young (9)
| State Farm Arena16,548
| 3–1
|-style="background:#cfc;"
| 5
| June 2
| @ New York
| 
| Trae Young (36)
| Clint Capela (15)
| Trae Young (9)
| Madison Square Garden16,512
| 4–1

|-style="background:#cfc;"
| 1
| June 6
| @ Philadelphia
| 
| Trae Young (35)
| Clint Capela (10)
| Trae Young (10)
| Wells Fargo Center18,624
| 1–0
|-style="background:#fcc;"
| 2
| June 8
| @ Philadelphia
| 
| Gallinari, Young (21)
| John Collins (10)
| Trae Young (11)
| Wells Fargo Center18,624
| 1–1
|-style="background:#fcc;"
| 3
| June 11
| Philadelphia
| 
| Trae Young (28)
| Clint Capela (16)
| Trae Young (8)
| State Farm Arena16,432
| 1–2
|-style="background:#cfc;"
| 4
| June 14
| Philadelphia
| 
| Trae Young (25)
| Clint Capela (13)
| Trae Young (18)
| State Farm Arena16,502
| 2–2
|-style="background:#cfc;"
| 5
| June 16
| @ Philadelphia
| 
| Trae Young (39)
| John Collins (11)
| Trae Young (7)
| Wells Fargo Center18,624
| 3–2
|-style="background:#fcc;"
| 6
| June 18
| Philadelphia
| 
| Trae Young (34)
| Capela, Huerter (11)
| Trae Young (12)
| State Farm Arena16,610
| 3–3
|-style="background:#cfc;"
| 7
| June 20
| @ Philadelphia
| 
| Kevin Huerter (27)
| John Collins (16)
| Trae Young (10)
| Wells Fargo Center18,624
| 4–3

|-style="background:#cfc;"
| 1
| June 23
| @ Milwaukee
| 
| Trae Young (48)
| Clint Capela (19)
| Trae Young (11)
| Fiserv Forum16,310
| 1–0
|-style="background:#fcc;"
| 2
| June 25
| @ Milwaukee
| 
| Trae Young (15)
| Capela, Collins (8)
| Bogdan Bogdanović (4)
| Fiserv Forum16,422
| 1–1
|-style="background:#fcc;"
| 3
| June 27
| Milwaukee
| 
| Trae Young (35)
| Clint Capela (11)
| Kevin Huerter (7)
| State Farm Arena16,650
| 1–2
|-style="background:#cfc;"
| 4
| June 29
| Milwaukee
| 
| Lou Williams (21)
| Capela, Collins (7)
| Lou Williams (8)
| State Farm Arena16,478
| 2–2
|-style="background:#fcc;"
| 5
| July 1
| @ Milwaukee
| 
| Bogdan Bogdanović (28)
| Capela, Collins (8)
| Kevin Huerter (7)
| Fiserv Forum16,389
| 2–3
|-style="background:#fcc;"
| 6
| July 3
| Milwaukee
| 
| Cam Reddish (21)
| John Collins (11)
| Trae Young (9)
| State Farm Arena16,620
| 2–4

Transactions

Trades

Free agents

Re-signed

Additions

Subtractions

Notes

References

Atlanta Hawks seasons
Atlanta Hawks
Atlanta Hawks